The Bombardment of Belgrade was an attack carried out by Austria-Hungary on the Serbian capital during the night of 28–29 July 1914. It is considered the first military action of World War I.

The bombardment started hours after the Austro-Hungarian declaration of war on Serbia. Three warships of the Austrian Danube Flotilla opened fire on the Serbian capital, followed in the early morning by Habsburg artillery from the town of Semlin (Zemun) across the Sava. The sporadic shelling caused widespread damage and mark the opening of the First Serbian Campaign. Upon hearing the news Tsar Nicholas II's government ordered general mobilisation of the Russian forces. The bombardment was followed, on 12 August, by the Habsburg Balkanstreitkräfte invasion of Serbia.

Background 
Following the Assassination of Archduke Franz Ferdinand, on 23 June 1914, the Austrian government alleging official Serb involvement, issued an ultimatum which expired on 25 July. Serbia responded within the time limit but Vienna rejecting negotiation, declared the Serb response unsatisfactory, severed diplomatic relations with Serbia and ordered military mobilisation.

Prelude 
A major weakness of Serbia was the location of its capital Belgrade, at the confluence of the Danube and the River Sava, immediately across from Austria-Hungary.  In mid July, Austria's Danube Flotilla, a naval group of the Imperial and Royal Navy based upstream at Semlin (Zemun), received orders to prepare itself for combat. The flotilla was to be used as artillery support of the Austro-Hungarian Armed Forces. Around the same time, an Austrian monitor group was sent from Budapest and the deployment of gunboats, tugboats and patrol boats on the Danube started. The Sava monitor group (SMS Maros, SMS Leitha, hospital ship Traisen and the tug Traun), part of the Danube Flotilla but subordinate to the commander of the 7th Infantry Division, was sent to Brčko in northeastern Bosnia. The task of the flotilla was to prepare the crossing of troops on the Sava and the Danube.

On 25 July a royal proclamation ordered the mobilisation of the Serbian Army, the call-up was rapid and efficient, as it had been executed several times in the preceding years, the Serbian government moved to Niš and the evacuation of Belgrade started. The Serbian Danube Division was in charge of defending Belgrade but had yet to be deployed to the north of the city, no artillery or machine guns were in place to defend against a gunboat attack. A group of gendarmes, a Chetnik detachment under Vojislav Tankosić and a company from the 18th Infantry Regiment were the only units defending the Serbian capital.

On the afternoon of 28 July the declaration of war was communicated to the Austro-Hungarian High Command (AOK) and a telegram was sent to the Serbian government in Niš.A meeting organised by the commander of the 14th Infantry Brigade, Colonel Emil von Baumgartner, took place that evening. It was decided that a few minutes after midnight, three river monitors were to depart and secure the bridges over the Sava between Semlin to Belgrade.

Bombardment of Belgrade 

Around midnight three Austrian tugs pulling barges loaded with infantry and escorted by a monitor, headed towards , the Serbian lower fortress. After coming under intense fire from a detachment of Serbian irregulars, the tugs and their barge gave up the landing attempt and headed upriver towards the railway bridge instead. Near 1 am, having anticipated that the Austro-Hungarians would attempt to cross the railway bridge that linked their country with the Hapsburg Empire, a detachment of Chetniks belonging to Major Tankosić's unit, dynamited the bridge over the Sava, while the monitors of the 1st Group were still manoeuvring.

The monitor group was under the command of frigate captain Friedrich Grund. The gunboats started firing 12-cm fused shells onto the Serbian side. Lacking the heavy artillery to respond the Serbs were unable to pierce the sides of the heavily armoured river boats. Once the monitors stopped firing to assess their impact, the Serbs started shooting at the river flotilla ships from the walls of Belgrade Fortress and from Great War Island. The monitors fired shrapnel in response then moved closer to the Belgrade Fortress, opening fire again with 12-cm fused shells, aiming for the radio station located in Kalemegdan Park and the neighbourhood of Topčidersko Brdo.

At 5 am Habsburg artillery located in Bežanija and Semlin, Austria-Hungary's eastern outpost across the Sava (today part of Belgrade), opened fire on the city and the Kalemegdan using Krupp Howitzer and Skoda 305 mm mortars.

By 6 am on the morning of 29 July, a shell hit a building across Grčka Kraljica with no casualties reported, more shells came and a secondary school, hotels, banks and a factory were reportedly hit. Shells continue to fall on Belgrade and Kalemegdan throughout the day hitting scores of buildings.

Casualties 
The reported casualties of the bombardment were named as Chetnik member Dušan Ðonović and Austro-Hungarian Karl Eberling, the captain of the first tug and Mikhail Gemsberger his helmsman.

Aftermath 
On 29 July the Russian Government officially announced to Berlin that it had mobilised four military districts, on 30 July general mobilisation was ordered. On 31 July a state of imminent war was proclaimed in Germany and the mechanism of mobilisation and counter-mobilisation started. Constant shelling on Serbia's border towns and cities continued until the second week of August. On 12 August the Habsburg 5th Army’s VIII and XIII Corps supported by the 2nd Army’s IV Corps, all part of the Balkanstreitkräfte, crossed the Drina river from Bosnia and the first invasion of Serbia started.

References 

Military history of Belgrade
Belgrade
1914 in Serbia
July 1914 events
20th century in Belgrade